Malini Wickramasinghe (born 22 July 1964) is a Sri Lankan sport shooter. She competed in rifle shooting events at the Summer Olympics in 1996 and 2000.

Olympic results

References

External links
 

1964 births
Living people
ISSF rifle shooters
Sri Lankan female sport shooters
Olympic shooters of Sri Lanka
Shooters at the 1996 Summer Olympics
Shooters at the 2000 Summer Olympics
Shooters at the 1994 Commonwealth Games
Commonwealth Games medallists in shooting
Commonwealth Games gold medallists for Sri Lanka
Commonwealth Games silver medallists for Sri Lanka
Medallists at the 1994 Commonwealth Games